Byas-Kyuyol is the name of several rural localities in the Sakha Republic, Russia:
Byas-Kyuyol, Gorny District, Sakha Republic, a selo in Atamaysky Rural Okrug of Gorny District
Byas-Kyuyol, Olyokminsky District, Sakha Republic, a selo in Charinsky Rural Okrug of Olyokminsky District